Shannon Galpin (born 1974) is an American activist, author, adventurer, and producer of the movie, Afghan Cycles.
In 2013, she was named, National Geographic Adventurer of the Year. Shannon started a US series of mountain biking camps called Strength in Numbers for women in their 20s and 30s who have experienced gender violence, with the belief that "an army of women can change the world." Shannon was runner up for two consecutive years in Elevation Outdoors Magazine's Resident Badass poll, in the Humanitarian category.

Life
She grew up in Bismarck, North Dakota.
In 2006, she founded Mountain2Mountain.

Works
Streets of Afghanistan: Bridging Cultures Through Art, Photographs by Libero Di Zinno, Hatherleigh Company, Limited, 2013,  

https://radicalhumanity.net Site run by Shannon Galpin, started in late 2016

References

External links
http://consciousmagazine.co/mountain-to-mountain/
http://www.summitdaily.com/news/13164266-113/galpin-women-afghanistan-mountain
www.examiner.com/article/mountain-biking-afghanistan-shannon-galpin-has-been-there-done-that

1971 births
Living people
American film producers
American women writers
People from Bismarck, North Dakota
American women film producers
21st-century American women